Göçeri (literally "nomadic" in Turkish) may refer to:

 Göçeri, Hamamözü, a village in the district of Hamamözü, Amasya Province, Turkey
 Göçeri, Kahta, a village in the district of Kahta, Adıyaman Province, Turkey
 Pileri, a village in district of Kyrenia (Girne), Cyprus, also known as Göçeri in Turkish